Jane Goldman (born September 16, 1964) is an American speed skater. She competed at the 1984 Winter Olympics and the 1988 Winter Olympics.

References

External links
 

1964 births
Living people
American female speed skaters
Olympic speed skaters of the United States
Speed skaters at the 1984 Winter Olympics
Speed skaters at the 1988 Winter Olympics
People from Skokie, Illinois
21st-century American women